N'Diaye Djiby (born 5 January 1994) is a Senegalese footballer who is under contract with the Italian club SSD CITTA DI ISERNIA He plays as a central midfielder.

References 

Eurosport Profile 

1994 births
Sportspeople from Thiès
Living people
Senegalese footballers
Association football midfielders
A.C. ChievoVerona players
S.S. Juve Stabia players
F.C. Lumezzane V.G.Z. A.S.D. players
Benevento Calcio players
U.S. Cremonese players
S.S. Racing Club Roma players
Serie A players
Serie B players
Serie C players
Senegalese expatriate footballers
Senegalese expatriate sportspeople in Italy
Expatriate footballers in Italy